Kate Heartfield is a Canadian author of fantasy, science fiction, horror, as well as a non-fiction writer and editor.

Life
Heartfield was born in 1977 in Kitchener, Ontario, and grew up in Winnipeg. 
She received a degree in political science from the University of Ottawa and a master of journalism degree from Carleton University. She worked as an editorial board member and columnist for the Ottawa Citizen from 2004-2015, and was editorial pages editor for the paper from 2013-2015. She was nominated for Canada's Canada's National Newspaper Award in the category of Editorial Writing category in 2015. She now teaches journalism at Carleton University and creative writing online for The Loft Literary Center. She lives in rural Ottawa, Canada.

Literary career
Heartfield's first published fiction appeared in the March 2013 issue of Black Treacle. She belongs to the Science Fiction and Fantasy Writers of America, the Historical Novel Scoeity, the Writers' Union of Canada, Ottawa's East Block Irregulars, and the Codex writers' group. She was a member of the board of the Ottawa International Writers Festival from 2011-2014, a member of the science fiction jury for the Ottawa Book Award in 2017, and is currently (2020) on the novel jury for the Sunburst Award.

Heartfield's writing has appeared in various periodicals, anthologies and podcasts, including Alice Unbound: Beyond Wonderland, Black Treacle, Clockwork Canada, Curiosities, Daily Science Fiction, Escape Pod, 49th Parallels, GlitterShip, Kaleidotrope, Lackington's, Liminal Stories, Monstrous Little Voices: New Tales from Shakespeare's Fantasy World, Murder Mayhem Short Stories, On Spec, PodCastle, Postscripts to Darkness #4, Shades Within Us: Tales of Migrations and Fractured Borders, Spellbound, Strange Horizons, Tesseracts Twenty-One: Nevertheless, Tesseracts Twenty-Two: Alchemy and Artifacts, and Waylines.

Heartfield has also written for Choice of Games.

Heartfield was announced as the author of then-upcoming Assassin's Creed novel The Magus Conspiracy in June 2022 as part of the series' 15th anniversary celebration. She was interviewed by community developer Sebasteann Barradas about the novel, including that it was to be the first of an expected trilogy entitled, The Engine of History. It was officially released on 2 August in the United States and 8 September for the United Kingdom. A sequel, The Resurrection Plot is tentatively slated for a 2023 release.

Recognition
Heartfield's novel Armed in her Fashion won the 2019 Aurora Award for Best Novel - English, was nominated for the 2019 Sunburst Award - Adult, and placed eighth in the 2019 Locus Poll Award for Best First Novel. Her interactive medieval adventure novel The Road to Canterbury was nominated for the 2019 Nebula Award for Best Game Writing. Her novella Alice Payne Arrives was nominated for the 2019 Nebula Award for Best Novella and the 2019 Aurora Award for Best Short Fiction - English. Her stories "The Seven O'Clock Man," "Not Valid for Spain," and "A Threadbare Carpet" were preliminary nominees for the Sunburst Award.

Bibliography

Novels
Armed in Her Fashion (2018)
The Embroidered Book (2022)

Interactive novels
The Road to Canterbury (2018)
The Magician's Workshop (2019)

Alice Payne
Alice Payne Arrives (2018)
Alice Payne Rides (2019)

The Engine of History
Assassin's Creed: The Magus Conspiracy (2022)
Assassin's Creed: The Resurrection Plot (2023)

Short stories

References

External links
 My Favorite Bit: Kate Heartfield talks about ARMED IN HER FASHION
 My Favorite Things with Kate Heartfield

1977 births
Living people
Canadian speculative fiction writers
Writers from Kitchener, Ontario
21st-century Canadian women writers